Claudia Rankine (born September 4, 1963) is an American poet, essayist, playwright and the editor of several anthologies. She is the author of five volumes of poetry, two plays and various essays.

Her book of poetry, Citizen: An American Lyric, won the 2014 Los Angeles Times Book Award, the 2015 National Book Critics Circle Award in Poetry (the first book in the award's history to be nominated in both poetry and criticism), the 2015 Forward Prize for Best Collection, the 2015 Hurston/Wright Legacy Award in Poetry, the 2015 NAACP Image Award in poetry, the 2015 PEN Open Book Award, the 2015 PEN American Center USA Literary Award, the 2015 PEN Oakland-Josephine Miles Literary Award, and the 2015 VIDA Literary Award. Citizen was also a finalist for the 2014 National Book Award and the 2015 T.S. Eliot Prize. It is the only poetry book to be a New York Times bestseller in the nonfiction category.

Rankine's numerous awards and honors include the 2014 Morton Dauwen Zabel Award from the American Academy of Arts and Letters, the 2014 Jackson Poetry Prize, and the 2014 Lannan Foundation Literary Award. In 2005, she was awarded the Academy Fellowship for distinguished poetic achievement by the Academy of American Poets. She is a 2016 United States Artist Zell Fellow and a 2016 MacArthur Fellow.

Rankine previously taught at Pomona College. , she is the Frederick Iseman Professor of Poetry at Yale University. In 2013, she was elected a Chancellor of the Academy of American Poets.

Life and work
Claudia Rankine was born in Kingston, Jamaica, and educated at Williams College and Columbia University.

She taught at Pomona College from 2006 to 2015.

Her work has appeared in many journals, including Harper's, GRANTA, the Kenyon Review, and the Lana Turner Journal, and she is a contributor to New Daughters of Africa, edited by Margaret Busby. Rankine co-edits (with Juliana Spahr) the anthology series American Women Poets in the 21st Century: Where Lyric Meets Language.

Winner of an Academy of American Poets fellowship, Rankine's work Don't Let Me Be Lonely (2004), an experimental project, has been acclaimed for its unique blend of poetry, essay, lyric and television imagery. Of this volume, poet Robert Creeley wrote: "Claudia Rankine here manages an extraordinary melding of means to effect the most articulate and moving testament to the bleak times we live in I've yet seen. It's master work in every sense, and altogether her own."

Rankine's play The Provenance of Beauty: A South Bronx Travelogue, commissioned by The Foundry Theatre, was a 2011 Distinguished Development Project Selection in the American Voices New Play Institute at Arena Stage.

In 2014, Graywolf Press published her book of poetry Citizen: An American Lyric.

Rankine also works on documentary multimedia pieces with her husband, photographer and filmmaker John Lucas. These video essays are titled Situations.

Of her work, poet Mark Doty wrote: "Claudia Rankine's formally inventive poems investigate many kinds of boundaries: the unsettled territory between poetry and prose, between the word and the visual image, between what it's like to be a subject and the ways we're defined from outside by skin color, economics, and global corporate culture. This fearless poet extends American poetry in invigorating new directions."

Rankine additionally founded and curates the Racial Imaginary Institute, which she called "a moving collaboration with other collectives, spaces, artists, and organizations towards art exhibitions, readings, dialogues, lectures, performances, and screenings that engage the subject of race."

In 2017, Rankine collaborated with choreographer and performer Will Rawls to generate the work What Remains. Collaborators included Tara Aisha Willis, Jessica Pretty, Leslie Cuyjet, and Jeremy Toussaint-Baptiste. The work premiered at Bard College, and has been performed at national venues, including Danspace in New York, the Walker Art Center, Yale Repertory Theatre, and Chicago's Museum of Contemporary Art Warehouse Space. In an interview with Rawls, Rankine described how text and language were manipulated in the performance: "As a writer, you spend a lot of time trying to get all of these words to communicate a feeling or to communicate an action, and to be able to get rid of the words but still hold the feeling was stunning to me."

The Racial Imaginary Institute 
The Racial Imaginary Institute (TRII) is an interdisciplinary collective established in 2017 by Rankine using funds from her 2016 MacArthur Grant. TRII is a think tank for artists and writers who study whiteness and examine race as a construct. Its mission is to convene "a cultural laboratory in which the racial imaginaries of our time and place are engaged, read, countered, contextualized and demystified."

Rankine envisions the organization as occupying a physical space in Manhattan; until that is possible, the institute is roving. In 2017, the Whitney Museum presented "Perspectives on Race and Representation: An Evening With the Racial Imaginary Institute" to address the debate sparked by Dana Schutz’s painting Open Casket. In the summer of 2018, TRII presented "On Whiteness," an exhibition, symposium, library, residencies, and performances, at The Kitchen in New York.

Awards and honors

2005: Academy Fellowship from the Academy of American Poets for distinguished poetic achievement 
2014: National Book Critics Circle Award (Poetry) winner for Citizen: An American Lyric
2014: National Book Critics Circle Award (Criticism) finalist for Citizen: An American Lyric
2014: California Book Awards Poetry Finalist for Citizen: An American Lyric
 2014: Jackson Poetry Prize (awarded by Poets & Writers)
 2015: PEN/Open Book Award for Citizen
 2015: PEN Center USA Poetry Award: for Citizen: An American Lyric
 2015: New York Times Bestseller for Citizen: An American Lyric
 2015: Los Angeles Times Book Prize in Poetry for Citizen: An American Lyric
 2015: NAACP Image Award for Outstanding Literary Work in Poetry for Citizen: An American Lyric
 2015: Forward Prize for Citizen: An American Lyric
 2016: MacArthur Fellowship.
 2016 United States Artist Zell Fellowship.
 2016: Bobbitt National Prize for Poetry for Citizen: An American Lyric
 2017: Colgate University, Honorary Doctor of Letters, May 21, 2017.
 2017: John Simon Guggenheim Fellowship for poetry
 2021: Elected a Royal Society of Literature International Writer

Selected publications

Don't Let Me Be Lonely: An American Lyric, Graywolf Press, 2004. 
The End of the Alphabet, Grove Press, 1998; 
Plot, Grove Press, 2001; 
Citizen: An American Lyric, Graywolf Press, 2014, 
The White Card: A Play, Graywolf Press, 2019, 
Just Us: An American Conversation, Allen Lane, 2020,

See also

American poetry
Caribbean literature
Caribbean poetry

References

Related media

 
 Claudia Rankine, Poet – at Blue Flower Arts
 Claudia Rankine poems, essays, and interviews at Poets.org
 Claudia Rankine, "'The Condition of Black Life Is One of Mourning'", The New York Times, June 22, 2015
 Claudia Rankine, "The Meaning of Serena Williams", The New York Times, August 25, 2015
 Claudia Rankine, [https://www.nytimes.com/2015/02/15/books/review/amiri-barakas-s-o-s.html Amiri Baraka's 'S O S'''], The New York Times Book Review, February 11, 2015
 Claudia Rankine, Interview with Lauren Berlant in Bomb magazine, Issue 129, October 1, 2014
 Paula Cocozza, "Poet Claudia Rankine: 'The invisibility of black women is astounding'", The Guardian, June 29, 2015
 Situation Videos – video essays on contemporary issues
 Academy of American Poets site – Her site includes an excerpt from Don't Let Me Be Lonely''
 PennSound page: audio and video
The Racial Imaginary Institute - official website

1963 births
African-American women writers
African-American poets
Living people
Iowa Writers' Workshop faculty
Place of birth missing (living people)
People from Kingston, Jamaica
American women poets
Jamaican women poets
Williams College alumni
Columbia University School of the Arts alumni
21st-century Jamaican poets
21st-century American poets
21st-century American women writers
MacArthur Fellows
Pomona College faculty
American women academics
21st-century African-American women
20th-century African-American people
20th-century African-American women
Members of the American Academy of Arts and Letters